Luana Zanella (born 4 October 1950 in Venice) is an Italian teacher and politician from Green Europe.

References 

1950 births
Living people
Green Europe politicians
University of Padua alumni
Italian educators
Federation of the Greens politicians
21st-century Italian women politicians
21st-century Italian politicians
Deputies of Legislature XIV of Italy
Deputies of Legislature XV of Italy
People from Venice
Women members of the Chamber of Deputies (Italy)